Heteromma is a genus of South African flowering plants in the family Asteraceae.

 Species
 Heteromma decurrens (DC.) O.Hoffm.
 Heteromma krookii (O.Hoffm. & Muschl.) Hilliard & B.L.Burtt
 Heteromma simplicifolium J.M.Wood & M.S.Evans

References

Asteraceae genera
Astereae
Endemic flora of South Africa